The canton of Reichshoffen is an administrative division of the Bas-Rhin department, northeastern France. It was created at the French canton reorganisation which came into effect in March 2015. Its seat is in Reichshoffen.

It consists of the following communes:

Biblisheim
Bitschhoffen
Dambach
Dieffenbach-lès-Wœrth
Durrenbach
Engwiller
Eschbach
Forstheim
Frœschwiller
Gœrsdorf
Gumbrechtshoffen
Gundershoffen
Gunstett
Hegeney
Kindwiller
Kutzenhausen
Lampertsloch
Langensoultzbach
Laubach
Lembach
Lobsann
Merkwiller-Pechelbronn
Mertzwiller
Mietesheim
Morsbronn-les-Bains
Niederbronn-les-Bains
Niedermodern
Niedersteinbach
Oberbronn
Oberdorf-Spachbach
Obersteinbach
Offwiller
Preuschdorf
Reichshoffen
Rothbach
Uhrwiller
Uttenhoffen
Val-de-Moder (partly)
Walbourg
Windstein
Wingen
Wœrth
Zinswiller

References

Cantons of Bas-Rhin